Autumn of Apple Trees is a 2020 Moroccan film directed by Mohamed Mouftakir. The film opened the National Film Festival in Tangier and was screened at the Cairo International Film Festival.

Synopsis 
Slimane is a young boy who has never known his mother, and who has been disowned by his father. He sets out to investigate and find out what really happened before he was born.

Cast 

 Fatima Kheir
 Saad Tsouli
 Naima Lamcherki
 Mohamed Tsouli
 Hassan Badida
 Ayoub Layoussoufi
 Anass Bajoudi

Awards and accolades 
2020 National Film Festival (Tangier)

 Grand Prize
 Best Image

References

External links 
 

2020 films
Moroccan drama films
2020s Arabic-language films
2020 drama films